Mireille Darc (15 May 1938 – 28 August 2017) was a French model and actress. She appeared as a lead character in Jean-Luc Godard's 1967 film Weekend. Darc was a Knight of the Legion of Honour and Commander of the National Order of Merit. Alain Delon was her longtime co-star and companion.

Early years
Born Mireille Christiane Gabrielle Aimée Aigroz in Toulon, she attended the Conservatory of Dramatic Arts in Toulon and moved to Paris in 1959.

Career

Darc's debut came in Claude Barma's television drama Du côté de l'enfer (aka, La Grande Brétèche, 1960). Her first leading role came in another production for French television, Jean Prat's Hauteclaire (1961). She starred in Jean-Luc Godard's film Weekend (Week-end, 1967) as Corinne, her highest profile role for international critics; as Christine in The Tall Blond Man with One Black Shoe (Le Grand Blond avec une chaussure noire, 1972) and The Return of the Tall Blond Man with One Black Shoe (Le retour du grand blond, 1974) and alongside Alain Delon and Louis de Funès in several films: Pouic-Pouic (1963), High Lifers (Les Bons Vivants (1965), Jeff (1969), Borsalino (uncredited, 1970), The Love Mates (Madly, 1970), Icy Breasts (Les Seins de glace, 1974), Death of a Corrupt Man (Mort d'un pourri, 1977), Man in a Hurry (L'Homme pressé, 1977), and the television series  (2003).

In the 1980s, Darc's career was interrupted by open-heart surgery following a car accident, in which she was seriously injured, and her separation from Alain Delon after fifteen years together. She quit her film career, but she returned to television in the 1990s. In 2006, French President Jacques Chirac awarded Darc the Legion of Honour.

Health and death

In 2013, Darc underwent further open heart surgery, and during 2016 she suffered several hemorrhages. She died on 28 August 2017 in Paris in a coma at the age of 79.

Theatre

Filmography

Feature films

Short films

As director

French-language dubbing

Bibliography
2008: Mon Père
2005: Tant que battra mon coeur (Autobiography)
1982: Jamais avant le mariage

Decorations
 Officer of the Legion of Honour (2015), (Knight in 2006)
 Commander of the National Order of Merit (2009)

References

External links

 
 
 Mireille Darc Official Site 

1938 births
2017 deaths
Actors from Toulon
French film actresses
French female models
Commanders of the Ordre national du Mérite
French television actresses
20th-century French actresses
21st-century French actresses
Officiers of the Légion d'honneur